The Faculty of Natural Sciences (FNS) (Slovak: Prírodovedecká Fakulta (PriF UK)) is a faculty of the Comenius University in Bratislava.

History 
Efforts to establish the Faculty of Natural Sciences in Slovakia during the interwar period were not successful. After split of the Czechoslovakia into the Protectorate of Bohemia and Moravia and the Slovak Republic and disposal of Czech higher education, Slovak students had no more science colleges available. The Natural Sciences Faculty of Slovak University (former name of Comenius University in Bratislava) was founded in 1940 and education in the first semester started in autumn 1940/1941. Faculty become independent from the Faculty philosophy of the then Slovak University, where some science subjects were previously taught. The first Dean was the František Valentin. From the beginning it consisted of Botanical and Geographical institute, the institute also Zoology and Comparative Anatomy. Several subjects as mathematics, physics and chemistry, were taught in the lecture hall of Slovak technical college. In the 1941 Geological Institute was added. A year later Mineralogical and Petrographic Institute was established. Both working in makeshift conditions without sufficient qualified staff. In the winter semester of 1942/1943 Institute of Nuclear Physics was added to the faculty and in 1944, Astronomical Institute and Institute of Mathematics were established. Only science without a separate department until 1948 was the chemistry. In the 1950 former institutes were organized into the departments. In 1980, Faculty of Mathematics, Physics and Informatics was separated from the Natural Sciences Faculty.

Campus 
Individual departments were formerly housed in several buildings in the center of Bratislava. From 1960s to 1987 five pavilion complex was built in the Mlynská Dolina Valley in the Bratislava for purposes of the Faculty. Apart from them, faculty has buildings of the Botanical garden, Department of Botany and a Biological research station at Šúr.

Sections 
The Natural Sciences faculty is divided up into the following sections:

Biological section 
 Department of Animal Physiology and Ethology
 Department of Anthropology
 Department of Botany
 Department of Ecology
 Department of Genetics
 Department of Microbiology and Virology
 Department of Molecular Biology
 Department of Plant Physiology
 Department of Zoology
 Institute of Cell Biology

Chemical section 
 Department of Analytical Chemistry
 Department of Biochemistry
 Department of Inorganic Chemistry
 Department of Nuclear Chemistry
 Department of Organic Chemistry
 Department of Physical and Theoretical Chemistry
 Institute of Chemistry

Environmental section 
 Department of Nature Conservation
 Department of Geochemistry
 Department of Landscape Ecology
 Department of Soil Science

Geographical section 
 Department of Cartography, Geoinformatics and Remote Sensing
 Department of Human Geography and Demogeography
 Department of Physical Geography and Geoecology
 Department of Regional Geography, Protection and Planning of the Landscape

Geological section 
 Department of Applied and Environmental Geophysics
 Department of Geology and Paleontology
 Department of Geology of Mineral Deposits
 Department of Hydrogeology
 Department of Engineering Geology
 Department of Mineralogy and Petrology
 Institute of Laboratory Research on Geomaterials

Other sections 
 Department of Didactics in Science, Psychology and Pedagogy
 Department of Languages
 Department of Physical Education
 Central Computing Centre

References

External links
 Official University site

Buildings and structures in Bratislava
Education in Bratislava
Comenius University